A kirtle (sometimes called cotte, cotehardie) is a garment that was worn by men and women in the Middle Ages. It eventually became a one-piece garment worn by women from the late Middle Ages into the Baroque period.  The kirtle was typically worn over a chemise or smock, which acted as a slip, and under the formal outer garment, a gown or surcoat.

History
Kirtles were part of fashionable attire into the middle of the 16th century, and remained part of country or middle-class clothing into the 17th century.

Kirtles began as loose garments without a waist seam, changing to tightly fitted supportive garments in the 14th century. Later, kirtles could be constructed by combining a fitted bodice with a skirt gathered or pleated into the waist seam.  Kirtles could lace up the front, back or side-back, with some rare cases of side lacing, all dependent upon the fashion of the day and place and upon the type of gown worn over it. Kirtles could be embellished with a variety of decorations including gold, silk, tassels, and knobs.

See also
Chemise
Girdle
Jumper

References

Further reading
Arnold, Janet:  Queen Elizabeth's Wardrobe Unlock'd, W S Maney and Son Ltd, Leeds 1988. 
Arnold, Janet: Patterns of Fashion: the cut and construction of clothes for men and women 1560-1620, Macmillan 1985. Revised edition 1986.
Ashelford, Jane: The Art of Dress: Clothing and Society 1500-1914, Abrams, 1996.   
Ashelford, Jane. The Visual History of Costume: The Sixteenth Century. 1983 edition, 1994 reprint.
Hearn, Karen, ed. ''Dynasties: Painting in Tudor and Jacobean England 1530-1630.  New York: Rizzoli, 1995.  .
 The Passionate Shepherd to His Love poem by Christopher Marlowe, in the 1590s.

14th-century fashion
Undergarments
Dresses
Gowns
Medieval European costume